Joseph Coady (1934 - 5 August 2008) was an Irish hurler who played for club side Erin's Own and at inter-county level with the Waterford senior hurling team.

Honours

Erin's Own
Waterford Senior Hurling Championship (1): 1962

Waterford
All-Ireland Senior Hurling Championship (1): 1959
Munster Senior Hurling Championship (1): 1959

References

1934 births
2008 deaths
Erin's Own (Waterford) hurlers
Waterford inter-county hurlers